Troy Byer (born November 7, 1964) is an American psychologist, author, director, screenwriter, and actress.

Early life and education

Born in New York City to an African-American mother and white father, Byer spent the first part of her career working in the entertainment industry. She began her acting career with a role on the children's program Sesame Street when she was four years old. She later studied acting and psychobiology at City University of New York and went on to earn a master's degree from Pacifica Graduate Institute in eco, liberation and community psychology. Byer holds a doctorate in clinical psychology from California Southern University with certification in Industrial Organizational Psychology.

Career 
After landing a bit part in Francis Ford Coppola's The Cotton Club (1984), Byer moved to Los Angeles, and became a regular on the ABC prime-time soap opera Dynasty in 1986, playing Jackie Deveraux, the daughter of Diahann Carroll's character Dominique Deveraux. Byer went on to earn ShoWest's Newcomer of the Year award for her leading role in the feature Rooftops (1989).

Since then, Byer acted in features such as Disorderlies (1987), The Five Heartbeats (1991) as Baby Doll, Weekend at Bernie's II (1993), Eddie (1996) starring Whoopi Goldberg, Robert Altman's The Gingerbread Man (1998) starring Kenneth Branagh and Robert Downey Jr., and John Q (2002) starring Denzel Washington.

In 1997, Byer made her screenwriting debut with B*A*P*S, starring Halle Berry. As she was unhappy with how her script was changed during the course of filming, in 1998 she decided to direct her next screenplay, Let's Talk About Sex (1998) herself while also playing a starring role. Byer made a trailer and took it to the Sundance Film Festival, where she gave it to film executives. The film was quickly picked up by Fine Line Features. Byer wrote and directed Love Don't Cost a Thing (2003) for Warner Brothers, based on the hit 1987 movie Can't Buy Me Love.

Byer is an active member of Agape International Spiritual Center and an advocate for the foster care system—a system to which she herself once belonged.

Byer is the author of two self-help books -- How To Be Ex-Free: 9 Keys To Happiness After Heartbreak, and How To Be A Responsibly Powerful Bitch.

Personal life 
Byer has one son, Jordan Burg, with her ex-husband Mark Burg.

Filmography

Film

Television

References

External links
 

1964 births
Living people
Actresses from New York City
American film actresses
American people of Jewish descent
African-American Jews
African-American actresses
African-American film directors
African-American film producers
African-American screenwriters
Film directors from New York (state)
Screenwriters from New York (state)
Film producers from New York (state)
American women film directors
American television actresses
American women film producers
21st-century African-American people
21st-century African-American women
20th-century African-American people
20th-century African-American women